Turricula faurei is a species of sea snail, a marine gastropod mollusk in the family Clavatulidae.

Description
The length of the shell attains 21 mm, its diameter 9.3 mm.

Distribution
This marine species occurs off the Agulhas Bank, South Africa.

References

 Barnard K.H. (1958), Contribution to the knowledge of South African marine Mollusca. Part 1. Gastropoda; Prosobranchiata: Toxoglossa; Annals of The South African Museum v. 44 p. 73–163

External links
 Indo-Pacific Mollusca; Academy of Natural Sciences of Philadelphia. Delaware Museum of Natural History v. 2 no. 9–10 (1968–1969)

Endemic fauna of South Africa
faurei
Gastropods described in 1958